Hype Transport Systems, Inc. is a vehicle for hire company  established in the Philippines in 2018. The Land Transportation Franchising and Regulatory Board (LTFRB) accredited the company as part of efforts by the Philippine Department of Transportation to promote competition with Grab. A feature that distinguishes Hype from Uber and other services that use mobile apps as their primary access point is that Hype Transport allows the use of older SMS technology as an alternative means for customers to use the service.

Operations 
HYPE is currently operational in Metro Manila and will be expanding their business in Metro Cebu launching on the first week of October 2019. HYPE offers Taxi, Sedan, AUV (6-Seater Car) and SUV (Premium Car) service.

HYPE Office Location:

Metro Manila:
1062 16th Flr. 139 Corporate Center, 139 Valero st Makati City

Metro Cebu:
Rm 1137 Regus 11th Flr Apple Equicom Tower Mindanao Avenue Ayalac Center Cebu City

Board of Directors 

President: Danilo M Cortez

CEO: Nicanor Escalante

COO: Jennifer Silan

CTO: Nicanor Codorniz Jr

VP IT: Mitchell Mae V. Matias

References 

Business organizations based in the Philippines